Brian Armstrong may refer to:
Brian Armstrong, ring name used by Brian Girard James (born 1969), American professional wrestler better known by another ring name, Road Dogg
Brian Armstrong (footballer), New Zealand international football (soccer) player
Brian Armstrong (businessman), (* 1983), founder and CEO of Coinbase